Abu Nasr Mamlan II (also spelled Muhammad II) was the last Rawadid amir (ruler) of Azarbaijan from 1058/9 to 1071. He was the son and successor of Abu Mansur Wahsudan. He was along with his sons arrested in 1070 by his suzerain, the Seljuk ruler Alp Arslan, thus marking the end of the Rawadid dynasty. However, their descendants, the Ahmadilis, recaptured Maragha in the early 12th-century.

The Rawwadids were promoters of Persian culture, which is demonstrated by Mamlan II and his father's patronage of the Persian poet Qatran Tabrizi. Mamlan II himself seems to have been a poet, yet no traces of his work has survived.

References

Sources 
 
 
 
 
 

11th-century monarchs in the Middle East
Year of death unknown
11th-century births
11th-century Kurdish people
Rawadid dynasty